Daniel Cudmore (born January 20, 1981) is a Canadian actor and stuntman. He is perhaps best known for his roles as the superhero Peter Rasputin / Colossus in the X-Men film series, and as the Volturi Felix in The Twilight Saga film series.

Personal life
Cudmore was born and raised in Squamish, British Columbia, to English parents Sue Bailey, who works for the British Columbia Film Commission, and Richard Cudmore, a doctor. Cudmore is the middle of three boys.

Cudmore attended Gannon University and was a member of the football team (2000–02). He is a former forward for the Capilano Rugby Football Club in Vancouver. His older brother Jamie Cudmore is a member of the Canadian Rugby World Cup team. His younger brother, Luke, also plays for Capilano RFC.

Career
Cudmore's first major role came in 2003 when he appeared as Piotr Rasputin in the second installment of the X-Men film franchise, X2. He auditioned for the title role in Superman Returns, but lost the role to Brandon Routh. He portrayed the Volturi Felix in The Twilight Saga: New Moon, The Twilight Saga: Eclipse, and The Twilight Saga: Breaking Dawn - Part 1. On July 11, 2012 it was confirmed that Cudmore would portray Master Chief Petty Officer John-117 in the live-action Halo 4: Forward Unto Dawn web series.

Cudmore reprised the role of Colossus in X-Men: Days of Future Past, in which he reteamed with Twilight co-star Booboo Stewart. Cudmore announced on February 17, 2015 that while Colossus would appear in the Deadpool film, he would not return to the role after he declined the offer when he was informed that his voice would be dubbed by a different actor; he was replaced by Stefan Kapičić who provided the character's voice.

Filmography

Film

Stunts

Television

References

External links

1981 births
Living people
Canadian male film actors
Canadian people of English descent
People from Squamish, British Columbia
21st-century Canadian male actors
Canadian male television actors
Canadian stunt performers
Male actors from British Columbia